The posterior chamber is a narrow space behind the peripheral part of the iris, and in front of the suspensory ligament of the lens and the ciliary processes. The posterior chamber consists of small space directly posterior to the iris but anterior to the lens. The posterior chamber is part of the anterior segment and should not be confused with the vitreous chamber (in the posterior segment).

Posterior chamber is an important structure involved in production and circulation of aqueous humor. Aqueous humor produced by the epithelium of the ciliary body is secreted into the posterior chamber, from which it flows through the pupil to enter the anterior chamber.

The hypermature cataractous lens or, the intraocular lens implanted after cataract surgery may obstruct the aqueous flow through the pupil. The block in flow of  aqueous from  the posterior to the anterior chamber will lead to a condition known as Iris bombe. In this condition,  pressure in the posterior chamber rises, resulting in anterior bowing of the peripheral iris and obstruction of the trabecular meshwork. This may result in an acute attack of angle closure glaucoma. Surgical management of Glaucoma due to Iris bombe include making a small hole in the iris which allows passage of aqueous from posterior chamber to anterior chamber either by YAG or Argon laser iridotomy  or by manual iridectomy.

Additional images

See also
Anterior chamber
Aqueous humour
Cataract surgery
Posterior chamber intraocular lens

References

External links
 
  - "Sagittal Section Through the Eyeball"

Human eye anatomy